The South Fork Cascade Canyon Trail is a  long hiking trail in Grand Teton National Park in the U.S. state of Wyoming. The trail begins at the Forks of Cascade Canyon and extends to Hurricane Pass. A short connector trail just before Hurricane Pass leads to Schoolroom Glacier. From the Forks of Cascade Canyon and most of the way through South Cascade Canyon, backcountry camping is allowed with a permit. The South Fork Cascade Canyon Trail is also part of the Teton Crest Trail its entire length and to the south beyond Hurricane Pass lies Alaska Basin.

See also
 List of hiking trails in Grand Teton National Park

References

Hiking trails of Grand Teton National Park